Stewart's Fountain Classics is an American brand of premium soft drinks. Stewart's are nostalgic "old fashioned" fountain sodas, having originated at the Stewart's Restaurants, a chain of root beer stands started in 1924 by Frank Stewart in Mansfield, Ohio. In 1990, the bottling rights to Stewart's were acquired by the Cable Car Beverage Corporation. Cream Soda and Ginger Beer flavors were introduced in 1992. Other flavors have been added since then. In November 1997 Cable Car Beverage Corporation was purchased by Triarc.  Cadbury Schweppes PLC acquired the Stewart's brands in 2000 along with Snapple and Mistic Brands for $1.45 billion.

Stewart's Root Beer was named the top root beer at the 2006 World Cup of Root Beer.

Stewart's drinks come in 12 fl. oz. (355 ml) glass bottles with twist-off tops. The bottles of some flavors are tinted amber, while the others are clear.

Flavors

See also 
Stewart's Restaurants

References

External links
Drink Stewart's
Stewart's brand at Dr. Pepper/Snapple

Root beer
Keurig Dr Pepper brands
American soft drinks